Claire Starozinski is a French teacher, writer, and animal welfare advocate focusing on opposition to bullfighting. She is president of the Anti-Corrida Alliance, which she founded in 1994, and author of several books and pamphlets on bullfighting, including On est toujours le taureau de quelqu'un (2003) and La Face cachée des corridas (2006). 

Michael Ogorzaly writes that Starozinski has taken part in several important legal battles in France to curtail bullfighting, including in July 2001 when the Alliance won a case in Toulouse that declared both that bullfighting was illegal, and that there was no continuous tradition of the practice there. The ruling was upheld in 2005 by the Supreme Court.

See also
Women and animal advocacy

Notes

Further reading
Alliance AntiCorrida, accessed 24 May 2012.
"En France, l’abolition de la corrida peine à s’imposer", Le Figaro, 5 May 2009.
Bruce Crumley, "Too Young to Bullfight?", Time, 4 August 2008.

French animal welfare workers
Criticisms of bullfighting
Year of birth missing (living people)
Living people